Rudakius is a genus of spiders in the family Salticidae. It was first described in 2016 by Prószyński. , it contains 7 species.

Taxonomy
The genus Rudakius was one of a number of new genera erected by Jerzy Prószyński in 2016, largely for species formerly placed in Pseudicius. Prószyński placed these genera in his informal group "pseudiciines", with Pseudicius as the representative genus. In Wayne Maddison's 2015 classification of the family Salticidae, Pseudicius, broadly circumscribed, is placed in the tribe Chrysillini, part of the Salticoida clade of the subfamily Salticinae.

Species
Rudakius comprises the following species:
 Rudakius afghanicus (Andreeva, Heciak & Prószyński, 1984) – Iran, Afghanistan, Kazakhstan, Uzbekistan 
 Rudakius cinctus (O. Pickard-Cambridge, 1885) – Iran, Central Asia to China 
 Rudakius ludhianaensis (Tikader, 1974)  –  India
 Rudakius maureri (Prószyński, 1992) – Malaysia 
 Rudakius rudakii (Prószyński, 1992)  –  Iran 
 Rudakius spasskyi (Andreeva, Heciak & Prószyński, 1984) – Iran, Central Asia 
 Rudakius wenshanensis (He & Hu, 1999) – China

References

Salticidae
Salticidae genera
Spiders of Asia